Editio Regia (Royal edition) is the third and the most important edition of the Greek New Testament of Robert Estienne (1503–1559). It is one of the most important representatives of the Textus Receptus, the first generation of printed editions of the Greek New Testament in history. It was named Editio Regia because of the beautiful and elegant Greek font it uses, known as the Grecs du roi.

It was edited by Estienne in 1550 at Paris. It is the first Greek Testament that has a critical apparatus. Estienne entered on the margins of the pages variant readings from 15 Greek manuscripts as well as many readings from the Complutensian Polyglot. He designated all these sources by symbols from α' to ιϛ'. The Complutensian Polyglot was signified by α'. The critical collation was the new subject, and although Estienne omitted hundreds of important variants from used witnesses, it was a significant early step towards textual criticism of the New Testament. 
The oldest manuscript used in this edition was the Codex Bezae, which had been collated for him, "by friends in Italy" (secundo exemplar vetustissimum in Italia ab amicis collatum). The majority of these manuscripts are held in the National Library of France to the present day. Estienne made only a few changes in the Erasmian Novum Testamentum: for example, he added verse Luke 17:36, which he took from Codex Bezae. 

The text of the editions of 1546 (first) and 1549 (second) was a composition of the Complutensian and Erasmian texts. The 1550 (third) edition (the Editio Regia proper) approaches more closely to the Erasmian fourth and fifth editions. According to John Mill, the first and second editions differ in 67 places, and the third in 284 places. The third edition became for many scholars, especially in England, the normative text of the Greek New Testament. It maintained this position until 1880. The 1551 (fourth) edition used exactly the same text as the third, without a critical apparatus, but the text is divided into numbered verses for the first time in the history of the printed text of Greek New Testament. It was used for the Geneva Bible.

Manuscripts and sources used in Editio Regia  

In his preface Estienne said that he had used sixteen manuscripts as his sources.

Manuscripts γ', δ', ε', ϛ', ζ', η', ι', ιε' were taken from the King Henry II's Library (Royal Library of France, now Bibliothèque nationale de France). It was suggested by Wettstein that θ' means Codex Coislinianus (it came to France ca. 1650, and was not available in time of Estienne).

See also 
 Complutensian Polyglot Bible 
 Novum Instrumentum omne 
 Textus Receptus

References

Further reading  
 J. J. Griesbach, Novum Testamentum Graece (London 1809)
 S. P. Tregelles, The Printed Text of the Greek New Testament, London 1854. 
 Bruce M. Metzger, Bart D. Ehrman, The Text of the New Testament: Its Transmission, Corruption and Restoration, Oxford University Press, 2005. 
 F.H.A. Scrivener, Textus Stefanici A. D. 1550 (1860)

External links 
 Editio Regia 1550 in the Internet Archive
 Editio Regia 1550
 The New Testament in the original Greek – 1881

Greek New Testament
Early printed Bibles
1550 books
1546 books
1549 books